Soviru (also Romanized as Sovīrū) is a village in Gavork-e Sardasht Rural District, in the Central District of Sardasht County, West Azerbaijan Province, Iran. At the 2006 census, its population was 284, in 47 families.

References 

Populated places in Sardasht County